Moïse Milliaud (born  in Carpentras) was a French rabbi and poet.

Milliaud was the author of Mishpat Emet, a philosophical essay on Job; Mateh Moshe, a rimed paraphrase of Ruth, with philosophical reflections; and Iggeret ha-Neḥamah, a rimed work purposing to console the reader in his sadness. All three works were published at Leghorn in 1787. In honour of Napoleon's birthday in 1806, Milliaud published with a French translation the Hebrew poem Mizmor Shir le-Napoleon. That same year, he was named representative for Vaucluse at the Assemblée des israélites de France et du royaume d'Italie, and a member of the Grand Sanhedrin.

Publications

References
 

18th-century French male writers
18th-century French poets
18th-century French rabbis
Hebrew-language poets
People from Carpentras